Anhui University, colloquially known in Chinese as An Da (安大, Āndà), is located in Hefei, the capital city of Anhui Province, China. Founded in 1928 in Anqing, named 'National Anhui University' in 1946 and moved to Hefei in 1958, Anhui University is supported by the government under the Double First Class University Plan and Project 211. It is a Chinese state Double First Class University recognized by the Ministry of Education of China. 

The university currently has approximately 27,000 students and 2500 staff including 1522 faculty members. It consists of 14 colleges, Anhui University's broad-based education covers philosophy, economics, law, literature, history, science, engineering and management. Its motto is 'honest, resolute, erudite, discreet'.

For the past 80 years Anhui University has provided higher education in fundamental knowledge, professional skills, social responsibility and innovative concepts. On its 80th anniversary the university hosted the 7th Forum of Presidents from Asian Universities. In 2015, the university purchased the Anhui University Bamboo Strips which is a collection of Warring States manuscripts currently under publication.

History 
Anhui University was established in 1928 in Anqing and moved to Hefei in 1952 where it was split into Anhui Agricultural College and Anhui Teacher's college. In 1958 the Anhui provincial government rebuilt the university in Hefei. Anhui University is a higher education institution supported by the government under the State Double First Class University Plan and the former 211 Project.

Campus 
The university has four campuses. The university consists of 18 schools, 44 departments, 65 undergraduate programs, 119 master's degree programs, 16 Ph.D. programs, one post-doctorate scientific research work station, two state-level disciplines and 12 provincial-level disciplines. The university has a staff of 2399 including 210 professors and 490 associate professors. The student population totals 28143 including 6466 mature students.

Library
The university library has a collection of more than 1.75 million books and over 7000 Chinese and foreign periodicals. There are two libraries in both the main campus and the new campus.

Department structure
Anhui University consists of 18 schools, 44 departments, 65 undergraduate programs, 119 master's degree programs, 16 PhD programs, one post-doctorate research flow work station, four professional master's degree programs, two state-level disciplines and 12 provincial-level disciplines. The university has a staff of 2399 consisting of 210 professors and 490 associate professors. The student population totals 28143 including 6466 mature students.

Postdoctoral Research Station 
Computer Application and Technology

State Key Disciplines 
Chinese Language & Graphonomy
Computer Application Technology

Provincial Key Disciplines 
Basic Mathematics and Probability Statistics
Material Physics
Inorganic Chemistry
Circuit and Systems
Foreign Philosophy
Political Economics
Economics Law
Ancient Chinese Literature
English Linguistics
Theoretical Physics
Computer Applications
Magnetic and Microwave Technology
Information Management and Information Systems
Arts and Design
Music

Research Institution for Human & Social Sciences under the Ministry of Education 
Huizhou Studies

Key labs under the Ministry of Education 
Intelligent Computing and Signal Processing

International exchange
The university participates in international exchange programs. It has agreements with 74 overseas universities. The university has accepted foreign students since 1980. It is approved by the Ministry of Education to enroll international students who have received Chinese government's scholarships. It was designated by Overseas Chinese Affairs Office under the State Council as the Teaching Base for Chinese Language and Culture in 2000. To date more than 700 international students from Asia, America and Europe have been admitted to study at the university.

See also 
 List of universities and colleges in Anhui
 List of universities in China

References

External links 

 
 Official website in English
 Anhui University wiki site
 Official website news in English

 
Universities and colleges in Hefei
Project 211
Educational institutions established in 1928
1928 establishments in China